The 2011 World Football Challenge was the second World Football Challenge event, a series of friendly football matches played in the United States and Canada in July and August.

Participants 
The 2011 tournament increased in scale from the 2009 incarnation, bringing in thirteen teams from seven different countries. All the teams were either a member of the UEFA or CONCACAF federations. The field was highlighted by Spanish league and European champions Barcelona and English champion Manchester United. Club América was the only team that returned from the 2009 competition.

This tournament for the first time also included five teams from Major League Soccer, the top-flight league for the host countries, United States and Canada. As another first, there were games played outside the United States, at Empire Field in Vancouver and BMO Field in Toronto.

North American clubs that competed in 2011 included Chicago Fire, Guadalajara, Club América, Los Angeles Galaxy, New England Revolution, Philadelphia Union, and Vancouver Whitecaps FC.

Four representatives from Europe's top leagues of England and Spain, all of whom won their country's blue ribbon competitions in the 2010–11 season joined the North American clubs, those being: Spanish and European champions Barcelona, FA Cup winners Manchester City, Premier League champions Manchester United and Copa del Rey winners Real Madrid.

Event rules 
The event rules differed considerably from the 2009 event, due to differences in the number of teams.

Match rules
Match rules followed the Laws of the Game, with a few notable exceptions. 
 In the event of a tie after the regulation 90 minutes, a penalty shootout immediately followed. These penalties did not accrue points in the table as a regulation goal or penalty would.
 Cautions and sending offs did not carry into the next competitive game, however, a player may have been suspended for their club's next WFC match.
 Teams had a roster of 25 players, and clubs were able to substitute eleven players during the course of the match rather than the standard three.

Table setup
The format was a single table, accruing points as follows:
 Three points for a regulation victory
 Two points for a penalty shootout victory
 One point for a penalty shootout loss
 No points for a regulation loss
 One point for each goal scored (up to three per match)
Sporting CP, who played only one game, did not accrue points, but their opponent, Juventus, were able to in their matchup. The five Major League Soccer teams were split up into two different "clubs" for the purposes of the table, the MLS Eastern Conference (containing the Chicago Fire, New England Revolution, and Philadelphia Union), and the MLS Western Conference (containing the Los Angeles Galaxy, who played two games, and the Vancouver Whitecaps). Each of the other seven clubs played three games and accrued points as normal.

Table tiebreakers
In the event of a tie in the final table standings, the following tiebreakers were used in order:
 Regulation goal difference
 Most goals for in regulation
 Fewest goals against in regulation
 Most goals scored in regulation in one match
 Drawing of lots

Standings

Matches 
All times are in the EDT time zone (UTC−4) (Local Times in parentheses).

Top goalscorers

Media coverage

References

External links

2011
2011–12 in Spanish football
2011–12 in English football
2011–12 in Mexican football
2011–12 in Italian football
2011 Major League Soccer season
2011
2011